Payera is a genus of flowering plants in the family Rubiaceae. It was described by Henri Ernest Baillon in 1878. The genus is endemic to Madagascar.

Species

 Payera bakeriana (Homolle) Buchner & Puff
 Payera beondrokensis (Humbert) Buchner & Puff
 Payera conspicua Baill.
 Payera coriacea (Humbert) Buchner & Puff
 Payera decaryi (Homolle) Buchner & Puff
 Payera glabrifolia J.-F.Leroy ex Buchner & Puff
 Payera homolleana (Cavaco) Buchner & Puff
 Payera madagascariensis (Cavaco) Buchner & Puff
 Payera mandrarensis (Homolle ex Cavaco) Buchner & Puff
 Payera marojejyensis Buchner & Puff

References

External links 
 Payera in the World Checklist of Rubiaceae

Rubiaceae genera
Danaideae
Taxa named by Henri Ernest Baillon